Wineland may refer to:

 Vinland, an area of coastal North America explored by Norse Vikings
 Boland, Western Cape, South Africa, referred to as the Cape Winelands
 David J. Wineland (born 1944), American physicist
 Eddie Wineland (born 1984), American mixed martial artist
 Claire Wineland (1997-2018), American activist, writer, and entrepreneur
 Wineland blue, a butterfly of family Lycaenidae

See also
 Weinland (disambiguation)